Serio may refer to:
Sério, a municipality in Rio Grande do Sul, Brazil
Serio (river), a river in Lombardy, Italy
11022 Serio, a main belt asteroid

People with the surname
José Sério (1922–2010), Portuguese footballer
Renato Serio (born 1946), Italian composer, conductor and arranger
Steve Serio (born 1987), American wheelchair basketball player

Fictional
Serio (HMX-13), a character from the visual novel To Heart